Münir Özkul (15 August 1925 – 5 January 2018) was a Turkish cinema and theatre actor. He has been awarded the title of "State Artist of Turkey". In 1972, he won a Golden Orange Award for Best Actor for his performance in Sev Kardeşim.

Career

He completed his formal education at İstanbul Erkek Lisesi. Özkul starting his acting career at Bakırköy Halkevi theatre. Later he worked at Ankara State theatre and İstanbul Şehir theatre. He became famous after his role in Muhsin Ertuğrul's Fareler ve İnsanlar. From the 1950s onwards, he acted mostly in cinema. During the 1970s, he appeared in many films of the director Ertem Eğilmez like Hababam Sınıfı, Şabanoğlu Şaban, Mavi Boncuk, Banker Bilo, Namuslu.

Many of these films paired him with the actress Adile Naşit. Other films include Edi ile Büdü, Halıcı Kız, Kalbimin Şarkısı, Miras Uğruna, Balıkçı Güzeli, Neşeli Günler, Gülen Yüzler, Gırgıriye, Görgüsüzler, Mavi Boncuk, Bizim Aile, Aile Şerefi. In the 1980s, he acted in some television series such as Uzaylı Zekiye, Ana Kuzusu ve Şaban ile Şirin.

Personal life
Özkul has married four times and he has three children. His second wife was actress Suna Selen. In 1998, he was awarded the title of "State Artist of Turkey" by the Turkish Ministry of Culture. He dealt with alcoholism for a number of years but stopped consuming alcohol completely in the 1990s. He suffered from dementia and chronic obstructive pulmonary disease since 2003. In the years before his death, he used to think that many people whom he knew in the past were still alive. On 5 January 2018, he died at his home in Cihangir, Beyoğlu, at the age of 92. After performing the funeral prayers at Teşvikiye Mosque, his body was buried in Bakırköy Cemetery.

Filmography

Film

Television

References

External links

1925 births
2018 deaths
Male actors from Istanbul
Turkish male film actors
Best Actor Golden Orange Award winners
Turkish male stage actors